Caballeronia telluris is a bacterium from the genus Caballeronia and the family Burkholderiaceae.

References

Burkholderiaceae
Bacteria described in 2013